You Make Me Feel is the third studio album by American rhythm and blues musician Don Bryant. It was released on June 19, 2020 under Fat Possum Records.

Critical reception
You Make Me Feel was met with "universal acclaim" reviews from critics. At Metacritic, which assigns a weighted average rating out of 100 to reviews from mainstream publications, this release received an average score of 83, based on 7 reviews. Aggregator Album of the Year gave the album 80 out 100 based on a critical consensus of 5 reviews.

Track listing

Charts

References

2020 albums
Fat Possum Records albums
Don Bryant (songwriter) albums